Sisters... No Way! is a young adult novel by the Irish author Siobhán Parkinson, first published in 1996. It is a two-sided book, written in the form of the diaries of two teenagers who become step-sisters through their parents' marriage.

The book won the Bisto Children's Books in Ireland Book of the Year in 1997.

External links 
  Previous winners of the Bisto Award
Sisters... No Way! at Fantastic Fiction

1996 novels
Epistolary novels
Irish young adult novels
Fictional diaries
1996 children's books